Mate Meštrović (born 13 September 1930, Zagreb, Sava Banovina, Kingdom of Yugoslavia), also known as Matthew Mestrovic (or Matthew Meštrović), is an American journalist and academic, Croatian lobbyist, politician and ambassador.

The son of Croatian-American sculptor Ivan Meštrović, he attended grade school in Zagreb before his family moved to Italy in 1942. The family lived in Switzerland from 1943-46 where he finished 'Ecole Internationale de Genève'. The family moved to the United States of America the following year where his father continued his work as an artist and where Mate would spend most of his life.

He graduated from university in 1951 and the following year received a master's degree in history at the Syracuse University. From 1954–1956, he served as a lieutenant in the US Army PsyWar in the Pacific and is also a Korean War veteran. He earned a PhD from Columbia University in 1957. He worked as a Contributing Editor of TIME and wrote many articles for American and European newspapers and magazines, including Commonweal, The New Leader, "The Intelligence Report" of The Economist, etc. He taught as Modern European history at Fairleigh Dickinson University and other United States universities from 1967–1991. In 1986, he was awarded the Ellis Island Medal of Honor.

Meštrović was active in the Croatian independence movement in Communist Yugoslavia. Meštrović led the Croatian National Congress. He visited Communist Yugoslavia for the first time in 1969. During this visit he made contacts with members of Hrvatski književni list and Matica hrvatska. From 1982-90 he served as president of the Croatian National Council, an umbrella group of Croatian emigrant organizations which lobbied for Croatian independence.

Meštrović has written several books in English and Croatian, notably What you should know about Communism and why, The struggle for Croatia and In the whirlpool of Croatian Politics. In the U.S., he  published Franjo Tudjman's book, Nationalism in Contemporary Europe, and Venko Markovski's Goli Otok – The Island of Death. He also authored several political tracts, notably Violations of Human and National Rights of the Croatian People in Yugoslavia and Croatian Response to the Memorandum of the Serbian Academy of Science and Art.

Meštrović returned to Croatia in the early 1990s. He served as a deputy in the Croatian Parliament (1993–97), member of Croatia's delegation to the Council of Europe and the Inter-Parliamentary Union and ambassador in Bulgaria (1997–2000).

Honours 

 Commander's Cross of the Order of Merit of the Republic of Poland (2019)

Notes

References
 "What you should know about communism and why" * "What Was Fascism?" 
 
 University of Notre Dame archives
 PREDSJEDNIK REPUBLIKE HRVATSKE

1930 births
Living people
Politicians from Zagreb
Representatives in the modern Croatian Parliament
20th-century Croatian historians
Ambassadors of Croatia to Bulgaria
Yugoslav emigrants to the United States
United States Army officers
United States Army personnel of the Korean War
Yugoslav anti-communists
Commanders of the Order of Merit of the Republic of Poland
Syracuse University alumni